Zeuzeropecten clenchi is a species of moth of the  family Cossidae. It is found in the Democratic Republic of the Congo.

References

Moths described in 2011
Zeuzerinae